Black gang may refer to:

 Black gang (ship), the members of a ship's crew who work in the fire room/engine room
Black Gang (organisation), a Turkish Cypriot paramilitary organisation formed in 1957 and abolished itself in 1958
 The Black Gang, an American punk rock band
 The Black Gang (novel), a 1922 novel by H. C. McNeile
 Blackgang, a village on the Isle of Wight
 Peckham Boys, a British gang also known as the Black Gang